"Just Squeeze Me (But Please Don't Tease Me)" is a 1941 popular song composed by Duke Ellington, with lyrics by Lee Gaines. The song has been recorded numerous times by a number of artists in the years since, having become a jazz standard. Hit recordings have been by Paul Weston & His Orchestra (vocal by Matt Dennis) (reached No. 21 in the Billboard charts in 1947) and by The Four Aces (No. 20 in 1952).

Other notable recordings
Louis Armstrong – originally recorded with Duke Ellington in 1961 for an album called The Great Reunion and later included in the compilation CD The Great Summit (2001)
Dave Brubeck
Clark Terry – Duke with a Difference (1957)
Chris Connor – A Jazz Date With Chris Connor (1956)
Miles Davis – Miles: The New Miles Davis Quintet (1955)
Ella Fitzgerald – Ella Fitzgerald Sings the Duke Ellington Songbook (1957)
Marvin Gaye and Mary Wells – Together (Marvin Gaye and Mary Wells album) (1964)
Joni James – The Mood Is Romance (1961).
Diana Krall – for her album Only Trust Your Heart (1995)
Peggy Lee – included on her album Olé ala Lee (1961)
Oscar Peterson – Great Connection (1974)
Jane Monheit - Live At The Rainbow Room  (2003)
Lou Rawls – for his album Your Good Thing (1969)
Jo Stafford – Jo + Jazz (1960)
Sarah Vaughan – for the album Sarah + 2 (1962)
Dave Grusin – Homage to Duke (1993)
Mulgrew Miller, Niels-Henning Ørsted Pedersen – The Duets (1999)

References

External links
"Just Squeeze Me (But Please Don't Tease Me)" at JazzStandards

1941 songs
Songs with music by Duke Ellington
Songs with lyrics by Lee Gaines
1940s jazz standards
Ella Fitzgerald songs